KKPX-TV (channel 65) is a television station licensed to San Jose, California, United States, serving the San Francisco Bay Area with programming from the Ion Television network. The station is owned by the Ion Media subsidiary of the E. W. Scripps Company, and has offices on Price Avenue in Redwood City; its transmitter is located atop San Bruno Mountain.

History
The station first signed on the air on November 15, 1986, as KLXV-TV (the last three letters of the callsign representing the Roman numeral for 65) and was an affiliate of the Trinity Broadcasting Network. In 1995, the station became an affiliate of the infomercial service InTV. In August 1997, the station's call letters were changed to KKPX after Paxson Communications (now Ion Media) bought the station. KKPX became a charter owned-and-operated station of Pax TV (the predecessor of Ion Television, to which the network was renamed in 2007) on August 31, 1998.

Newscasts
From 2000 to 2005, KKPX aired rebroadcasts of KNTV (channel 11)'s 6 and 11 p.m. newscasts at 7 and 11:30 p.m. each weeknight. The newscasts were originally branded as NewsChannel 11 on Pax when KNTV was affiliated with The WB; after KNTV joined NBC in January 2002, the newscasts were first renamed to NBC 3 News on Pax, then to NBC 11 News on Pax several months later, after KNTV stopped branding by its common channel number on Bay Area cable systems. Like most other such arrangements involving Pax stations and major network affiliates, the simulcasts were dropped on June 30, 2005 (the day prior to Pax's rebranding as i: Independent Television).

Technical information

Subchannels
The station's digital signal is multiplexed:

KKPX-TV had plans for a Mobile DTV feed of subchannel 65.1. A Mobile DTV feed did later launch, but it carried programming from 65.2 (Qubo).

Analog-to-digital conversion
KKPX-TV shut down its analog signal, over UHF channel 65, on June 12, 2009, as part of the federally mandated transition from analog to digital television. The station's digital signal remained on its pre-transition UHF channel 41, using PSIP to display KKPX-TV's virtual channel as 65 on digital television receivers, which was among the high band UHF channels (52-69) that were removed from broadcasting use as a result of the transition.

References

External links

Ion Television affiliates
Bounce TV affiliates
Court TV affiliates
Defy TV affiliates
Laff (TV network) affiliates
TrueReal affiliates
Scripps News affiliates
E. W. Scripps Company television stations
Television channels and stations established in 1986
1986 establishments in California
KPX-TV
Television in San Jose, California